Moses Thatcher (February 2, 1842 – August 21, 1909) was an apostle and a member of the Quorum of the Twelve Apostles  in the Church of Jesus Christ of Latter-day Saints (LDS Church). He was one of only a few members of the Quorum of the Twelve to be dropped from the Quorum but to remain in good standing in the church and retain the priesthood office of apostle.

Early life
Thatcher was born in Sangamon County, Illinois, to Hezekiah Thatcher and Alena Kitchen. The Thatcher family joined the Church of Jesus Christ of Latter Day Saints in 1843, and moved to Macedonia, Illinois, and later to Nauvoo. Together, with the main body of the church, they began their trek westward in 1846 and arrived in the Salt Lake Valley in September 1847.

Hezekiah and Alena, with seven of their eight living children (including Thatcher), departed for California in 1849, seeking to acquire wealth through the Gold Rush. They returned to Utah Territory in 1857. Thatcher was called to serve a mission for the church at age 15, from which he returned in 1858. In 1859, the family settled in Cache Valley, where Thatcher helped Hezekiah locate canal and mill sites.

From 1860 to 1861, Thatcher studied at the University of Deseret. From 1866 to 1868, he served a second mission, this one to the United Kingdom and France. He later served as the church's first mission president in Mexico.

Apostolic service
Thatcher was called to be an apostle and a member of the Quorum of the Twelve Apostles in April 1879. He was called to replace Orson Hyde, who died on November 28, 1878.

From 1880 to 1898, Thatcher was the second assistant to Wilford Woodruff in the superintendency of the Young Men's Mutual Improvement Association (YMMIA).

At the April 1896 General Conference of the church, Thatcher was dropped from the Quorum of the Twelve in consequence of his not being "in harmony" with the other leaders of the church about a proposed policy called "The Political Rule of the Church," commonly referred to as "the political Manifesto." This policy would have required that the general authorities of the church to obtain the approval of the First Presidency before seeking public office. This statement was signed by all the apostles at the time except Thatcher, who refused on grounds of conscience, citing the church's long-standing position on political neutrality. (Apostle Anthon Lund also did not sign the document due to his absence while presiding over the church's European Mission.)

However, Thatcher was not excommunicated from the church and retained his position in the leadership of the YMMIA. Thatcher remained supportive of the church after being removed from the Quorum, testifying on many occasions of the divinity of the work and the divinity of the calling of its leaders. Matthias F. Cowley was called to replace Thatcher in the Quorum of the Twelve. Thatcher held the priesthood office of apostle until his death.

Post-Quorum of the Twelve service
After being removed from the quorum, Thatcher testified in the Reed Smoot hearings held before the Senate Committee on Privileges and Elections. He was supportive of the church and its positions.

Thatcher died at his home on August 21, 1909 in Logan, Utah. He is buried in the Logan Cemetery.

Notes

External links
 Moses Thatcher's Missionary Diaries Digital Collections, Harold B. Lee Library, Brigham Young University
 Grampa Bill's G.A. Pages: Moses Thatcher

1842 births
1909 deaths
19th-century Mormon missionaries
American Mormon missionaries in France
American Mormon missionaries in Mexico
American Mormon missionaries in the United Kingdom
American Mormon missionaries in the United States
American general authorities (LDS Church)
Apostles (LDS Church)
Counselors in the General Presidency of the Young Men (organization)
Latter Day Saints from California
Latter Day Saints from Illinois
Latter Day Saints from Utah
Mission presidents (LDS Church)
Mormon pioneers
People from Logan, Utah
People from Sangamon County, Illinois
University of Utah alumni
Utah Democrats